Huilong is a town of Zhongjiang County in east-central Sichuan province, China, situated  southeast of the county seat as the crow flies. , it has one residential community (社区) and 17 villages under its administration.

See also 
 List of township-level divisions of Sichuan

References 

Towns in Sichuan
Deyang